Kudayathoor  is a village in Idukki district which is located along the Thodupuzha-Puliyanmala road in the Indian state of Kerala. Kudayathoor is famous for its scenic beauty mostly because of the towering presence of Western ghats on one side. A number of Malayalam films have also been shot in this area like Kunjikoonan (2002 film), Vasanthiyum Lakshmiyum Pinne Njaanum, Vismayathumbathu, Drishyam, Kadha Parayumbol, Rasathanthram.  Malankara dam, which is a hydro electric power plant located in Muttom, uses this place as its catchment area.

Demographics
 India census, Kudayathoor had a population of 9590 with 4822 males and 4768 females.

References

Villages in Idukki district